Guilder Alfredo Rodríguez Pérez (born July 24, 1983) is a Venezuelan former professional baseball infielder and current professional baseball coach in the Texas Rangers organization. He played in Major League Baseball (MLB) for the Texas Rangers.

Playing career
Rodríguez spent his first 7 professional seasons (2002-2008) in the Milwaukee Brewers organization. He was selected in the minor league phase of the 2008 Rule 5 draft by the Texas Rangers. Rodríguez spent 2009-2015 playing at the AA and AAA levels in the Rangers organization.

Texas Rangers
After 13 years in the minor leagues, he was called up to the majors for the first time on September 7, 2014, and made his major league debut two days later. With a total of 1,095 games, Rodriguez had played in the most minor league games by any player not yet called to the major leagues. On September 22, 2014 against the Houston Astros in Arlington, Rodríguez recorded his first two career hits, the second of which gave him his first career RBI. Rodríguez became a free agent on November 7, 2014. He re-signed with the Rangers on a minor league deal on January 13, 2015. He announced his retirement on September 17, 2015.

Coaching career
After retiring from playing, Rodríguez became a coach in the Texas Rangers organization. He served as a coach for the DSL Rangers in 2016, and was a coach for the AZL Rangers from 2017 through 2021. He spent the 2022 season as a developmental coach for the Down East Wood Ducks.

Personal life
Rodríguez's brother, Guillermo, played in MLB for the San Francisco Giants and Baltimore Orioles.

See also
 List of Major League Baseball players from Venezuela
 Rule 5 draft results

References

External links

Pura Pelota

1983 births
Living people
Arizona League Brewers players
Arizona League Rangers players
Beloit Snappers players
Brevard County Manatees players
Cardenales de Lara players
Frisco RoughRiders players
Helena Brewers players
Huntsville Stars players
Major League Baseball players from Venezuela
Major League Baseball second basemen
Major League Baseball shortstops
Major League Baseball third basemen
Minor league baseball coaches
Oklahoma City RedHawks players
Sportspeople from Barquisimeto
Round Rock Express players
Texas Rangers players
Venezuelan baseball coaches
Venezuelan expatriate baseball players in the United States
West Virginia Power players